Klaus Karl Ludwig (born 5 October 1949) is a German racing driver.

Biography 
He also known as König Ludwig ("King Ludwig") for his success in touring cars and in sports car racing.

 
In the 1970s, Ludwig drove for Ford in the Deutsche Rennsport Meisterschaft, winning in 1979 with a Kremer Racing-Porsche 935. With this car, based on the then 15-year-old Porsche 911 road car design, he won the 24 Hours of Le Mans overall in the wet, an unprecedented win against the faster pure sports car racing prototypes (though it was subsequently matched in 1995 when a McLaren F1 GTR won the race at its first attempt).

In 1984 and 1985, he won the 24 Hours of Le Mans for Joest Racing in their #7 Porsche 956. Considering Le Mans and sportcars too dangerous after the deaths of Manfred Winkelhock and Stefan Bellof, he was recruited for the 1987 World Touring Car Championship for Ford only to finish runner-up by a single point to BMW driver Roberto Ravaglia after a post-season disqualification (after Ludwig claimed the pole, he and fellow West German Klaus Niedzwiedz had finished second behind teammates Steve Soper and Pierre Dieudonné at the Bathurst 1000 in Australia, but both cars were disqualified due to illegal wheel arch size on their Ford Sierra RS500's). He then moved to the Deutsche Tourenwagen Meisterschaft (DTM), and became champion in 1988 in a Ford Sierra RS500. Ludwig also represented IMSA in the 1986 International Race of Champions, finishing 8th.

He repeated the success at Mercedes-Benz in 1992 and 1994, before moving back to sports cars racing for them in 1997 to become the 1998 FIA GT Champion. He retired when the series did not continue in the 1999 season.

He soon returned in June 1999, to win the 24 Hours Nürburgring on the Nordschleife for the third time driving a Zakspeed Viper.

When the DTM resumed as Deutsche Tourenwagen Masters in 2000, he returned to the series, winning at the age of 50 years at the Sachsenring circuit, only to retire once again.

Ludwig returned as a "hobby pilot" to the Nürburgring Nordschleife when given the opportunity to drive a high power vehicle. 
The years 2004 and 2005 saw him enter the 24 Hours Nürburgring with Uwe Alzen on the Jürgen Alzen Porsche 996 GT2 Bi-Turbo. With a normally aspirated Porsche 997 GT3 of the Alzen brothers, Ludwig and Christian Abt managed to beat the old distance record in the 2006 edition of the 24h, yet finished only second, 1 lap behind the winners.

Ludwig has also worked as a TV commentator on DTM races.

Racing record

Achievements
 Winner 24 Hours of Le Mans: 1979, 1984, 1985
 Deutsche Rennsport Meisterschaft champion 1979, 1981
 Deutsche Tourenwagen Meisterschaft champion 1988, 1992, 1994
 FIA GT World Champion 1998

Complete European Formula Two Championship results
(key) (Races in bold indicate pole position; races in italics indicate fastest lap)

Complete 24 Hours of Le Mans results

Complete World Touring Car Championship results
(key) (Races in bold indicate pole position) (Races in italics indicate fastest lap)

* Overall positions shown. WTCC points paying positions may be different

Complete Deutsche Tourenwagen Meisterschaft/Masters results
(key) (Races in bold indicate pole position) (Races in italics indicate fastest lap)

Complete International Touring Car Championship results
(key) (Races in bold indicate pole position) (Races in italics indicate fastest lap)

† — Retired, but was classified as he completed 90% of the winner's race distance.

References

External links

1949 births
Living people
Sportspeople from Bonn
German racing drivers
Deutsche Tourenwagen Masters drivers
Deutsche Tourenwagen Masters champions
FIA GT Championship drivers
International Race of Champions drivers
European Formula Two Championship drivers
World Touring Car Championship drivers
24 Hours of Le Mans drivers
24 Hours of Le Mans winning drivers
Speedcar Series drivers
Racing drivers from North Rhine-Westphalia
World Sportscar Championship drivers
ADAC GT Masters drivers
24 Hours of Spa drivers
12 Hours of Sebring drivers
HWA Team drivers
Team Rosberg drivers
Team Joest drivers
Mercedes-AMG Motorsport drivers
Porsche Motorsports drivers
Phoenix Racing drivers
Nürburgring 24 Hours drivers